Big Boi and Dre Present... Outkast is a greatest hits album by the American hip hop duo Outkast, released by LaFace Records and Arista Records on December 4, 2001. The compilation consists of five tracks from Southernplayalisticadillacmuzik, one from ATLiens, and three each from the break-out albums Aquemini and Stankonia. There are three new tracks: "The Whole World" featuring Killer Mike, "Movin' Cool (The After Party)" featuring Joi, and "Funkin' Around". In addition, "Ain't No Thang", "Southernplayalisticadillacmuzik", "Aquemini", "Git Up, Git Out", "Ms. Jackson", "Rosa Parks", "SpottieOttieDopaliscious", and "B.O.B (Bombs Over Baghdad)" differ from the album versions. It also omits some songs that were released as singles, notably all but one from ATLiens. However, the title track from the album is mentioned as being included on this compilation in the essay contained in the booklet, but is not actually included. It is assumed it was dropped at a late stage of the compilation's production, although it is included on the album in place of the intro in New Zealand.

The album reached Platinum status and reached a peak of number 18 on the Billboard 200.

Track listing

Charts

Weekly charts

Year-end charts

Certifications

References

Outkast compilation albums
2001 greatest hits albums
Albums produced by Organized Noize
LaFace Records compilation albums
Arista Records compilation albums